Checupa is a genus of moths of the family Noctuidae.

Species
 Checupa curvivena Prout, 1924
 Checupa equifortis Prout, 1924
 Checupa fortissima Moore, 1867
 Checupa stegeri Hreblay & Thöny, 1995

References
 Checupa at Markku Savela's Lepidoptera and Some Other Life Forms
 Natural History Museum Lepidoptera genus database

Hadeninae